Aniselytron is a genus of Asian plants in the grass family.

 Species
 Aniselytron agrostoides Merr. - Taiwan, Philippines
 Aniselytron treutleri (Kuntze) Soják - China (Fujian, Guangxi, Guizhou, Hubei, Sichuan, Taiwan, Yunnan), Bhutan, Sikkim, Darjeeling, Sumatra, Japan, Sabah, Myanmar, Vietnam

 formerly included
see Calamagrostis Poa 
 Aniselytron epileuca - Poa epileuca 
 Aniselytron gracilis - Calamagrostis abnormis
 Aniselytron petelotii - Calamagrostis abnormis

See also
 List of Poaceae genera

References

Poaceae genera
Pooideae